This is a list of French television related events from 2012.

Events
12 May - Stéphan Rizon wins the first series of The Voice: la plus belle voix.
7 September - Nadège Jones wins the sixth series of Secret Story.
1 December - Singer Emmanuel Moire and his partner Fauve Hautot win the third series of Danse avec les stars.
26 December - Shadow theatre company Die Mobilés win the seventh series of La France a un incroyable talent.

Debuts
25 February - The Voice: la plus belle voix (2012–present)
12 November - Harry (2012-2013)
6 December - Star Academy (2001-2008, 2012-2013)
11 December - Nouvelle Star (2003-2010, 2012–present)

Television shows

1940s
Le Jour du Seigneur (1949–present)

1950s
Présence protestante (1955-)

1970s
30 millions d'amis (1976-2016)

2000s
Plus belle la vie (2004–present)
La France a un incroyable talent (2006–present)
Secret Story (2007–present)

2010s
Danse avec les stars (2011–present)

Ending this year

Births

Deaths

See also
2012 in France